Archer Mathews (1744 –  1796) was a United States pioneer, legislator, and city founder in the colony (and later U.S. state) of Virginia. He was a member of the Virginia House of Delegates from Greenbrier County from 1780 to 1782.

Life 

Archer Mathews was born in 1744 in Augusta County, Virginia, to Ann (Archer) and John Mathews. His parents were among the first European settlers of Augusta County, likely having immigrated to America during the Scotch-Irish immigration of 1710–1775. His father was a notable member of the early Augusta County community, serving as a militia captain and public officer. Archer Mathews was the youngest of eleven siblings, and was a minor when his father died in 1757. He sold the land bequeathed him to a brother in 1768, and moved to the new frontier of Greenbrier County, where his brothers Sampson and George Mathews had established the area's first European trade network. He married Letitia McLanahan and had seven children.

In Greenbrier County, Mathews was saddler, and served as one of county's first magistrates, overseeing road construction, surveying the land, and holding court. On the outbreak of the American Revolutionary War, Mathews served as commissary for Fort Randolph, an American outpost erected in 1776 for defense against Indian raiding. Mathews purchased a large drove of cattle and hogs for the fort in November 1776 and delivered it through territory under regular attack from Indians. Mathews was elected to the Virginia House of Delegates from Greenbrier County for the sessions of 1780–81 and 1781–82. During the latter session he was appointed one of eight original trustees of the city of Lewisburg, Virginia (now West Virginia) on its formation, and as such he worked to develop the city and partition its land into plots to be sold. One such plot was bought by a nephew, Joseph Mathews, who was the grandfather of 5th West Virginia governor Henry Mason Mathews.

Archer Mathews died c. 1790, and was buried at the Old Stone Church in Lewisburg, West 
Virginia.

References

Bibliography
 
 
 
 
 
 
 
 
 

City
American Freemasons
West Virginia pioneers
American surveyors
American city founders
People from Augusta County, Virginia
Members of the Virginia House of Delegates
People from Greenbrier County, West Virginia
Virginia colonial people
Virginia militiamen in the American Revolution
West Virginia colonial people
People of pre-statehood West Virginia
1744 births
1796 deaths
Mathews family of Virginia and West Virginia
Trustees of populated places in Virginia
18th-century American politicians